Leandro Andrade may refer to:

 Leandro Andrade, involved in Lockyer v. Andrade
 Leandro Andrade (footballer) (born 1999), Cape Verdean footballer